Tenth Night is an Iranian drama series. The series is written and directed by Hassan Fathi.

Storyline 
The story of the series takes place during the reign of Reza Shah in Tehran. A person named Heidar Khoshmaram (Hossein Yari), who is from old Tehran, he wants to marry a girl (Katayoun Riahi) of Qajar descent and that girl stipulates the condition of marriage with Haidar to perform Ta'zieh on the ten nights of Muharram, What happens to Heidar during the Ta'zieh changes his character and...

Cast 
 Hossein Yari
 Katayoun Riahi
 Roya Teymourian
 Soraya Ghasemi
 Parviz Poorhosseini
 Parviz Fallahipour
 Mahmoud Pak Niat
 Akram Mohammadi
 Ebrahim Abadi
 Atash Taqipour
 Sedigheh Kianfar
 Shahin Alizadeh
 Ramsin Kebriti
 Abbas Zafari
 Mohammad Reza Ghasemi
 Mozaffar Moghaddam
 Farshid Samadipour
 Alaeddin Ghassemi
 Hossein Khanibeik
 Amir Atashani
 Hossein Afshar
 Manoochehr Azar
 Hamid Reza Afshar
 Amir Baranlooyi
 Pantea Mohammadi
 Jaber Ghafarian
 Nasser Gitijah
 Davoud Jafarpour
 Shapoor Kalhor
 Mohammad Varshochi
 Ahmad Azizi
 Sedigheh Kianfar
 Maryam MehrAli
 Morshedali Torabi
 Ali Zabihi
 Mehdi Jamshidi
 Masoud Taslimi

References

External links
 

2000s Iranian television series
Iranian television series